Potameia is a genus of plant in laurel family (Lauraceae). It contains 23 species, which are native to Madagascar (22 species) or Thailand (1 species).

Species
 Potameia antevaratra Kosterm. - Madagascar
 Potameia argentea Kosterm. - Madagascar
 Potameia capuronii Kosterm. - Madagascar
 Potameia chartacea Kosterm. - Madagascar
 Potameia confluens van der Werff - Madagascar
 Potameia crassifolia Kosterm. - Madagascar
 Potameia eglandulosa Kosterm. - Madagascar
 Potameia elliptica Kosterm. - Madagascar
 Potameia incisa Kosterm. - Madagascar
 Potameia micrantha van der Werff - Madagascar
 Potameia microphylla Kosterm. - Madagascar
 Potameia nitens Kosterm. - Madagascar
 Potameia obtusifolia van der Werff - Madagascar
 Potameia resonjo Kosterm. - Madagascar
 Potameia reticulata Kosterm. - Madagascar
 Potameia rubra Kosterm. - Madagascar
 Potameia salicifolia Kosterm. - Madagascar
 Potameia siamensis Kosterm. - Thailand
 Potameia thouarsiana (Baill.) Capuron - Madagascar
 Potameia thouarsii Roem. & Schult. - Madagascar
 Potameia tomentella van der Werff - Madagascar
 Potameia vacciniifolia Kosterm. - Madagascar
 Potameia velutina Kosterm. - Madagascar

References

Lauraceae genera
Taxonomy articles created by Polbot
Flora of Madagascar
Flora of Thailand
Lauraceae